Gordon Charles Hocking (12 August 1919 – 24 March 1986) was an Australian rules footballer who played for Collingwood in the Victorian Football League (VFL).

Football
Hocking was primarily a knock ruckman but could also play most positions around the ground. He made his debut at Collingwood in the 1938 VFL season  and was a losing Grand Finalist in his first two seasons. In 1950 he was appointed club captain and he remained in the role the following year, leading Collingwood to a Preliminary Final which they lost to Essendon by two points. Hocking was a regular interstate representative for Victoria and starred at the 1950 Brisbane Carnival. That year he was named as a half back flanker in the Sporting Life Team of the Year.

Hocking retired during the 1952 VFL season, the last remaining pre-World War II VFL player.

Military service
He served overseas with the Second AIF.

References

Sources
 Bolfo, Tony, "200 Club push for 'Mulga', Baxter and Bob", Carlton Football Club, 14 March 2017.
 Holmesby, R. and Main, J. (2007) The Encyclopedia of AFL Footballers, 7th ed, Melbourne: Bas Publishing.
 Piesse, K. (2011) Great Australian Football Stories, The File Mile Press: Scoresby, Victoria. .
 World War Two Nominal Roll: Corporal Gordon Charles Hocking (VX82888), Department of Veterans' Affairs.
 World War Two Service Record: Corporal Gordon Charles Hocking (VX82888), National Archives of Australia.

External links

 
 
 Gordon Hocking, at Collingwood Forever.

1919 births
Australian rules footballers from Melbourne
Collingwood Football Club players
Chelsea Football Club (Australia) players
1986 deaths
Australian Army personnel of World War II
Australian Army soldiers
People from South Melbourne
Military personnel from Melbourne